Jacobus Leus du Plooy (born 12 January 1995) is a Hungarian-South African first-class cricketer who plays for Derbyshire. He was included in the Free State squad for the 2016 Africa T20 Cup. In August 2017, he was named in Benoni Zalmi's squad for the first season of the T20 Global League. However, in October 2017, Cricket South Africa initially postponed the tournament until November 2018, with it being cancelled soon after.

In September 2018, he was named in Northerns' squad for the 2018 Africa T20 Cup. He was the leading run-scorer for Northerns in the tournament, with 145 runs in four matches. He was also the leading run-scorer in the 2018–19 CSA Provincial One-Day Challenge, with 593 runs in eleven matches, and the leading run-scorer for Northerns in the 2018–19 CSA 3-Day Provincial Cup, with 647 runs in eleven matches.

In April 2019, Du Plooy signed a two-year contract to play county cricket in England, joining Derbyshire as a Kolpak player. In April 2022, he was bought by the Welsh Fire for the 2022 season of The Hundred.

Personal life 
Leus is of Hungarian descent and holds a Hungarian passport.

References

External links
 

1995 births
Living people
South African people of Hungarian descent
Hungarian people of South African descent
Cricketers from Pretoria
South African cricketers
Free State cricketers
Knights cricketers
Northerns cricketers
Titans cricketers
Derbyshire cricketers
Welsh Fire cricketers
South Western Districts cricketers
Boland cricketers
Joburg Super Kings cricketers